Sandhya Ray (born 4 January 1974) is an Indian politician. She was elected to the Lok Sabha, lower house of the Parliament of India from Bhind, Madhya Pradesh in the 2019 Indian general election as member of the Bharatiya Janata Party.

Personal life
Ray was born to father Sabharam Tainguriya and mother Ram Katori Bai Tainguriya on 4 January 1974 in Kamra, Morena in Madhya Pradesh. She did her Master of Arts and Bachelor of Law from Jiwaji University, Barkatullah Vishwavidyalaya, Bhopal and Government State Level Law College, Bhopal. She married Suman Ray on 16 April 1984, with whom she has two sons and a daughter. Ray is an advocate and agriculturalist by profession.

References

External links
 Official biographical sketch in Parliament of India website

1974 births
Living people
India MPs 2019–present
Lok Sabha members from Madhya Pradesh
Bharatiya Janata Party politicians from Madhya Pradesh
People from Bhind
People from Datia